Rothesay is a town located in Kings County, New Brunswick, Canada. It is adjacent to the City of Saint John along the Kennebecasis River.

Geography
Located along the lower Kennebecasis River valley, Rothesay borders the city of Saint John to the southwest, and the neighbouring town of Quispamsis to the northeast. It is served by a secondary mainline of the Canadian National Railway, though there is no longer any passenger service on the line.

History

The town developed first as a shipbuilding centre and later as a summer home community for Saint John's wealthy elite with the arrival of the European and North American Railway in 1853. There is a commonly known story that the new town was named in honour of the visiting Prince of Wales, later King Edward VII, in 1860 because the area was said to have reminded him of Rothesay, on the Isle of Bute, in Scotland.

However, an entry made in the diary of William Franklin Bunting, of Saint John, during the same visit refers to the Rothesay train station. It is unlikely that the name would have taken hold less than a day after the prince's passage through the settlement and so it likely predates the visit or was specifically bestowed on the town in the prince's honour as Duke of Rothesay. In 1870, a Saint John-owned ship named Rothesay made a famous voyage when a 20-year-old woman named Bessie Hall took command of the fever-stricken ship and sailed it from Florida to Liverpool, England.

Present day
Rothesay contains many historical landmarks, such as the Rothesay Common, the Rothesay Yacht Club, the former train station (one of the last remaining examples of early railway architecture in Canada), many homes that pre-date Confederation, public parks and modern amenities. The community provides numerous places of worship and recreation areas, along with the convenience of local retail and large-scale commercial developments in the nearby city of Saint John. According to a 2015 Canadian Business article, the top five richest neighbourhoods in the Province of New Brunswick all lie within the Town of Rothesay. Police services are provided by Kennebecasis Regional Police Force.

Rothesay lies in the Anglophone South School District and schools include Rothesay Park School, Rothesay High School and Rothesay Netherwood School and was formerly the headquarters of New Brunswick School District 06, Both New Brunswick Route 100 and New Brunswick Route 111 run through the town and connect with New Brunswick Route 1. The town is served by Saint John Transit.

Demographics 

Amalgamation
Following the December 1992 release of a government discussion paper entitled "Strengthening Municipal Government in New Brunswick's Urban Centres", a series of localized feasibility studies were commissioned by the Frank McKenna Liberals targeting six geographic areas: Edmunston, Campbellton, Dalhousie, Miramichi, Moncton, and Saint John. In each instance, a panel composed of local representatives and expert consulting staff made specific recommendations for each urban-centred region. The report for the Greater Saint John area, "A Community of Communities: Creating a stronger future" - often referred to simply as the Cormier Report - offered two potential solutions to the Province for consolidating the many municipalities in Greater Saint John, neither of which was ultimately adopted by government.     

Option one offered by the Cormier Report was to create three communities with regionalization of some services. Under this option, the six Kennebecasis Valley communities (East Riverside-Kinghurst, Fairvale, Gondola Point, Quispamsis, Renforth, and Rothesay) plus the local service district of the Parish of Rothesay would be consolidated into one new municipality. The Town of Grand Bay and various unincorporated areas around Saint John would also be consolidated into the City of Saint John to form the second new municipality. The third municipality in this scenario would be Westfield, which would remain separate because it was more rural and less populated. In this scenario, many services including water and sewerage, planning, and economic development would be regionalized across the three municipalities.   

The second option offered by Cormier was a full consolidation of eight of the existing communities into one new city. In this scenario, only Westfield would remain a separate municipality. Full consolidation was unpopular among residents outside the City of Saint John. Suburban residents stated generally that they were pleased with their communities as they were and that they liked their lower tax rates. As Cormier summarized it, residents "perceive Saint John as an expensive, poorly managed bureaucracy that does not serve its citizens well. They fear loss of control, loss of services, and loss of neighbourhood friendliness and sense of community." Suburban residents' comments at public meetings support this description. One Fairvale resident stated that he resented the questionnaire Commissioner Cormier had circulated to residents that asked them to rank their order of preference for his five reorganization schemes because it meant that the worst that full amalgamation could do is fifth place. As the resident put it, "full amalgamation into one city would come about three million, nine hundred and fifty-sixth on anybody's choice. That would come just above amalgamation with Red China."    

Ultimately, neither of the two options was implemented. Rather, the provincial government chose to proceed with partial consolidations and opted to legislate cost sharing for five specific regional facilities. On January 1, 1998, the former incorporated villages of East Riverside-Kinghurst, Fairvale, and Renforth; the town of Rothesay; and part of the community of Wells in the local service district of the Rothesay Parish were amalgamated to form the town of Rothesay. The town motto, Quinque luncta In Uno (Five United In One), represents the joining together of the five founding communities.

Occasional discussion about the possibility of further amalgamating Rothesay with Quispamsis has not proceeded beyond the discussion phase, though the two municipalities do collaborate extensively to share services and facilities. Notably, both towns' boundaries were also left largely unaltered by the strategic restructuring undertaken during the Higgs-Allain Local Governance Reforms.

Notable people

Rear Admiral Daniel Lionel Hanington was sunk by a U-boat, participated in the sinking of another U-boat, eventually becoming Deputy Chief of Staff (Support) for NATO's naval command.
Billionaire industrialist James K. Irving currently resides in Rothesay, as well as some members of his family, including his niece Sarah Irving.
Sarah Irving, Executive Vice President and Chief Brand Officer of Irving Oil, educated at, and on the Board of Governors for the Rothesay Netherwood School.
Canadian aviation pioneer Wallace Rupert Turnbull invented the variable-pitch propeller in Rothesay.

See also
List of communities in New Brunswick
 Long Island (Kings County)
Minister's Face Nature Preserve
 Kings West (New Brunswick electoral district)

References

External links

 Town of Rothesay 

Communities in Kings County, New Brunswick
Towns in New Brunswick
Communities in Greater Saint John